The 1920 Dartmouth football team was an American football team that represented Dartmouth College as an independent during the 1920 college football season. In its fourth and final season under head coach Clarence Spears, the team compiled a 7–2 record and outscored opponents by a total of 199 to 68. James Robertson was the team captain.

On November 27, 1920, Dartmouth played Washington, 28–7, in  the inaugural game at Husky Stadium.

Schedule

References

Dartmouth
Dartmouth Big Green football seasons
Dartmouth Indians football